Jankampet Junction railway station (station code:JKM) is one of the two railway stations which serves the city of Nizamabad in Telangana state of India.

Administration 
It falls in Hyderabad railway division under the South Central Railway zone of Indian Railways. Due to overgrowth on the western side of Nizamabad, the Jankampet Junction railway station falls under the administration of Nizamabad.

Line and location 
It is just to the south of the junction where the branch railway from Bodhan meets the Secunderabad–Manmad line. Jankampet railway station is situated 10 kilometers away from Nizamabad Junction railway station .

Routes
 Jankampet Jn–Nizamabad Jn/Secunderabad Jn
 Jankampet Jn– Jn
 Jankampet Jn–Bodhan

See also

List of railway junction stations in India

References

External links

Railway stations in Nizamabad district
Railway junction stations in Telangana
Hyderabad railway division